In 2004, there were nearly 1,000 printed media in Slovenia, including newspapers, magazines and journals.

This article is a list of  newspapers published in Slovenia or in Slovene.

Daily 

{| class="sortable wikitable"
! style="width:10%;"| Title
! style="width:10%;"| English Title
! style="width:15%;"| Content
! style="width:15%;"| Format
! style="width:2%;"| Est.
! style="width:20%;"| Owner
! style="width:20%;"| Publisher
! style="width:20%;"| Headquarters
! style="width:23%;"| Orientation
! style="width:23%;"| Website
|-
| Delo || Labor || General || Broadsheet || 1959 || FMR, d.d. || Delo, d.d. || Ljubljana || Left-wing, Social liberalism ||  
|-
| Dnevnik || Journal || General || Berliner || 1951 || 35%: Državna založba Slovenije (State Publishing House of Slovenia)25,74%: Styria Media International AGand others || Dnevnik, d.d. || Ljubljana || Left-wing ||  
|-
| EkipaSN || TeamSN ||  Daily sports news || / || 1995 || Media24 || Salomon, d.o.o. || Ljubljana || / ||  
|-
| Finance || Finances || Daily business and financial news || Berliner || 1992 || Bonnier Group || Časnik Finance, d.o.o. || Ljubljana || Liberalism, Centrism ||  
|-
| Slovenske novice || Slovenian News || General || Tabloid || 1991 || Delo, d.d. || Delo, časopisno založniško podjetje d.o.o. (Delo Publishing) || Ljubljana || ? ||  
|-
| Večer || Evening || General || Berliner || 1945 || Dober večer || Časnik Večer, d.o.o. || Maribor || Centrism ||  
|-
| Svet24 || World24 || General || Tabloid || 2013 || Media24 || Salomon, d.o.o. || Ljubljana || ? || 
|}

Primorske novice (Koper), regional

Abroad 
Časopis Porabje, newspaper of Hungarian Slovenes
Glasilo kanadskih Slovencev, newspaper of Canadian Slovenes
Nedelja, Roman Catholic newspaper of Roman Catholic Diocese of Gurk in Klagenfurt, Austria
Primorski dnevnik, Slovene daily in Trieste, Italy
Svobodna Slovenija, weekly newspaper of the Argentine Slovenes

In foreign languages 
Népújság, Hungarian minority weekly

Historical

List of historical newspapers include also the newspapers that were published German:
1787–1918 Laibacher Zeitung, main German-language newspaper of Ljubljana

See also
 List of magazines in Slovenia

References

External links

Slovenia
 
 
 
Newspapers